The Algeria men's national water polo team is the representative for Algeria in international men's water polo.

Results

FINA World League
 2002 — Didn't participate
 2003 — Didn't participate
 2004 — Didn't participate
 2005 — Didn't participate
 2006 — Didn't participate
 2007 — Didn't participate
 2008 — Preliminary round
 2009 — Preliminary round
 2010 — Preliminary round

References

Water polo
Men's national water polo teams
National water polo teams in Africa
National water polo teams by country
 
Men's sport in Algeria